The Epiphone Crestwood was a solid-body electric guitar launched in 1958 and discontinued in 1970. After Epiphone discontinued the Crestwood, a number of re-issues and replicas has been available from different companies.

History
The Crestwood was launched in 1958 by Epiphone. The guitar was a double cutaway solid-body construction in mahogany with dual New Yorker pickups, three-on-a-side headstock and a pickguard with the Epiphone logo. In late 1959 the guitar was renamed the Crestwood Custom and the body's edges were rounded off and the pickguard got a different design. In 1961 the dot markers were replaced with oval markers and the pickguard lost its Epiphone logo. By 1963 the body got a slightly longer upper horn, a six on-a-side headstock and the gold plating were replaced with nickel plating. Epiphone also launched the Crestwood DeLuxe which can easily be described as a three pickup version of the Crestwood Custom, it also featured an ebony fretboard with block inlays. The Crestwood DeLuxe was discontinued in 1969 and the Crestwood Custom the year after.

Notable users

 Elliott Smith
 Vigilante Carlstroem - The Hives
 "Captain" Kirk Douglas - The Roots
 Robert Dahlqvist - The Hellacopters, Thunder Express
 Ray Hanson - Thee Hypnotics
 Wayne Kramer - MC5
 Fred "Sonic" Smith - MC5
 Deniz Tek - Radio Birdman
 Johnny Winter

References

External links
Official Epiphone website
Epiphone collectors site

Crestwood